W. F. Carter House, also known as the Carter House, is a historic home located at Mount Airy, Surry County, North Carolina. It was built about 1908, and is a two-story, Classical Revival style frame dwelling. It features a central two-story Ionic order portico, with a one-story Doric order porch which runs beneath the portico for the full length of the three-bay facade.  The house is an enlarged and remodeled earlier dwelling.  Also on the property is a contributing outbuilding.

It was listed on the National Register of Historic Places in 1983.

References

Houses on the National Register of Historic Places in North Carolina
Neoclassical architecture in North Carolina
Houses completed in 1908
Houses in Surry County, North Carolina
Mount Airy, North Carolina
National Register of Historic Places in Surry County, North Carolina
1908 establishments in North Carolina